Arben Zharku (born 2 February 1982 in Kaçanik, Kosovo) is a producer and actor from Kosovo. Former Director of Kosovo Cinematography Center and SKENA UP International Students Film and Theatre Festival in Pristina. He graduated from the Faculty of Arts of the University of Pristina in 2004, in Acting, and in 2009 he graduated as a Producer at EAVE (European Audiovisual Entrepreneurs). From 2003-2014 Arben has also been working as a Manager at the Multimedia Centre in Pristina which has the aim to develop contemporary and children's theatre. As an actor, he has perform in different theater performances as well in different films. As a producer he has been involved in various film productions trying to build the respective infrastructure and he makes efforts to extend his knowledge by gaining experience from film production experts. 
He is member of the European Film Academy and member of the Board of Directors of the European Film Promotion.

Early life
Zharku was a teenager during the Kosovo war. He remained in Kaçanik when the heavy invasion began and in early 1999 went up into the nearby mountains to assist doctors treating the injured. He claims to have witnessed atrocious acts of aggression and slaughter.

Producer
Zharku moved into film production through his background in theater. In 2009 with his partner Jeton Neziraj they formed Qendra Production with the aim to develop cinematography in Kosovo, focusing on new voices, developing filmmakers and creating opportunities for international co-production.

In 2011 Zharku won the Best Producer Award at the Abu Dhabi Film Festival with his film The Wedding Tape directed by Ariel Shaban.

Zharku is a voting member of the European Film Academy.

In April 2012 Arben was awarded  with Europe's highest Co-production Prize for short film, given by Robert Bosch Foundation for his film I'll Go To War, But First Make Me a Coffee.

Director Kosovo Cinematography Center

Since April 2011, Zharku has been involved with Kosovo Cinematography Center, first as a President of the board and from January 2014 as a director. KCC is a public film foundation responsible for financing films. At 29 years of age, actor-producer Arben Zharku has just been appointed head of the KCC.
 
As a Director he is now involved in enabling various film productions and building an infrastructure within Kosovo for expanding film production. This is to sustain the growth of what is being called the "Kosovo New Wave". With highly acclaimed intentional talents such as Jamie Donoughue,  Daniel Mulloy, Blerta Zeqiri, as well as new artists such as Adriana Matoshi and Lulzim Bucolli having international success both in the box-office and critically at Cannes Film Festival, Berlin International Film Festival and Sundance Film Festival among others.

Controversy

On his appointment as President, Zharku controversially spoken out against the stagnating state of film financing in Kosovo. Zharku has urged for reform of the structure of film financing within Kosova arguing for financing of the "Kosovo New Wave" filmmakers who have traditionally made 'no budget' or guerrilla filmmaking films.

Zharku has set out to back voices that he believes are relevant and powerful, voices with international reach. For Zharku it is important that the stories of filmmakers and actors are heard and that the growing swell of new Kosovar talent is nurtured.

"With the youngest population in Europe it is high time that our new voices are heard".
Arben Zharku on Kohavision

Festival Director

Zharku is one of the founders and was a director (2003-2013) of SKENA UP International Students Film and Theatre Festival in Pristina.

SKENA UP Festival is considered as one of the biggest festivals in Kosovo and the main student film and theater festival in the Balkan region.

More than 40 Film academies from around the world are presented every year at SKENA UP including National Film and Television School, American Film Institute, Film and TV School of the Academy of Performing Arts in Prague, Marubi film school, London Film School etc.

Special guests have included: Arta Dobroshi, Katriel Schory, Nik Powell, Jan Harlan, Donall McCusker, Mark O'Halloran, Pavel Jech, Daniel Mulloy, Nikola Vukčević, Jacques Achoti, Gjergj Gjuvani, Bernd Buder, Daniel Stamm, Enver Petrovci.

Jury Member

Zharku has been a Jury Member at numerous international film festivals including:

 Tel-Aviv International Students Film Festival in Israel in 2010 (international competition).
 Cottbus Film Festival in Germany in 2010 (short competition program).
 Art Film Festival in Slovakia in 2010 (main competition program).
 Munich International Student's Festival in Germany 2011.
 ACT Festival in Bilbao 2010.

Other activity

Zharku speaks Albanian and English.

External links
 
 https://web.archive.org/web/20120227011158/http://www.skenaup.com/?cid=2%2C5

References

Living people
Kosovan male actors
1982 births